James Blears, Jr (January 6, 1948 – February 4, 2011) was the 1972 World Surfing Champion.

History
Jimmy Blears was born in California the oldest son of former NWA and WWA pro-wrestling champion, Lord James "Tally-Ho" Blears, also an avid surfer who appeared in the seminal surfing documentary, The Endless Summer. At the age of eleven Blears moved with his family to Hawaii, where he learned surfing from his father. During his career Blears was a professional C&C North Shore lifeguard for 25 years, as well as being a professional surfer.

Blears died in his sleep on February 4, 2011, in Honolulu, at the age of 63.

Family
Blears' sister, Laura, was one of the world's top female surfers during the 1970s. His youngest brother, Clinton “Tallyho” Blears was also a noted professional surfer.

References

External links

1948 births
2011 deaths
American surfers
Sportspeople from Hawaii